Billy Louis Williams (born June 7, 1971) is a former American football wide receiver who played one season with the St. Louis Rams of the National Football League (NFL). He was drafted by the Arizona Cardinals in the seventh round of the 1995 NFL Draft. He first enrolled at Northeastern Oklahoma A&M College before transferring to the University of Tennessee. Williams attended Alcoa High School in Alcoa, Tennessee.

References

External links
Just Sports Stats

Living people
1971 births
Players of American football from Tennessee
American football wide receivers
African-American players of American football
Tennessee Volunteers football players
St. Louis Rams players
People from Alcoa, Tennessee
21st-century African-American sportspeople
20th-century African-American sportspeople